Eduardo Mendoza may refer to:

Eduardo Mendoza Goiticoa (1917-2009), Venezuelan scientific researcher, politician, and statesman
Eduardo Mendoza Garriga (1943-), Spanish novelist